Jebali is an Arabic surname, it may refer to:

 Amor Jebali (born 1956), Tunisian footballer
 Hamadi Jebali (born 1949), Tunisian engineer and politician
 Issam Jebali (born 1991), Tunisian footballer 
 Zied Jebali (born 1990), Tunisian footballer

Arabic-language surnames